Ron Currie Jr. is an American author.

Background and education
Currie was raised in Waterville and lives in Portland, Maine. He attended Clemson University and withdrew before graduation.

Career
Currie's first book, God is Dead, was published to critical acclaim in 2007, earning Currie comparisons to Kurt Vonnegut  and Raymond Carver.   God is Dead received the Young Lions Fiction Award from the New York Public Library,  as well as the Metcalf award from the American Academy of Arts and Letters.   Critics praised the book's daring mix of dark humor and earnest sentiment.  Andrew Ervin, writing in The Believer, said “few authors would dare to depict the near rape and death of God amid a horrendous genocidal war, and fewer still could make it so bladder-threateningly hilarious.”   Bookpage said “Each of the chapter-length stories seem to have emerged from a fever dream, sampling alternate futures that spring up like mutant weeds.”   God is Dead was named a notable book of 2007 by the San Francisco Chronicle.

Currie published his first full-length novel, Everything Matters!, in 2009.  The winner of an Alex Award from the American Library Association,  Everything Matters! made several best-of lists for 2009, including the Los Angeles Times,  National Public Radio,  and Amazon.com.   Writing in the New York Times, Janet Maslin called Currie a “startlingly talented writer” who “survives the inevitable, apt comparisons to Kurt Vonnegut and writes in a tenderly mordant voice of his own.”

Currie's third book, the novel Flimsy Little Plastic Miracles, was published by Viking in February, 2013. The New Yorker called it the writer's "most grounded work yet and perhaps his darkest." "Anything does seem possible in Currie's fantastical fiction...Currie's gorgeously questioning prose explores the deeper meanings things gain after they're gone."

Currie's writing has won the New York Public Library Young Lions Award, the Addison M. Metcalf Award from the American Academy of Arts and Letters, and the Alex Award from the American Library Association.

Currie is also a screenwriter, most recently working on the Apple TV+ series "Extrapolations."

Bibliography 
 God Is Dead (2007)
 Everything Matters! (2009)
 Flimsy Little Plastic Miracles (2013)
 The One-Eyed Man (2017)

References

External links
 The New York Times review of Everything Matters!
 Currie reads in Bosphorus Art Project Quarterly
 Ron Currie Lecture at University of Toledo, 20 September 2011

20th-century American novelists
Clemson University alumni
Living people
1975 births
Date of birth missing (living people)
People from Waterville, Maine
American psychological fiction writers
Novelists from Maine
American male novelists
American male short story writers
20th-century American short story writers
20th-century American male writers